I Remember When This All Meant Something... is the second official mixtape from Milwaukee, Wisconsin rapper Gerald Walker.  All of the songs, except for 4 (Not At All, Wait A Minute, Gotta Work & High), are featureless. Other popular songs on the mixtape are Silent and The Journey. Gerald Walker also serves as the executive producer for the majority of the mixtape with help from Barron 'Slot-A' Bollar.

Track listing

Production credits
 Executive Producer: Barron 'Slot-A' Bollar
 Mixing engineer: Barron 'Slot-A' Bollar
 Executive Producer: Gerald Walker
 Tracking engineer:  Gerald Walker

Song Notes
 I'm Gonna Remember That You Are My Friend, And Fall Asleep On Your Floor are lyrics from Chicago, Illinois punk rock band The Lawrence Arms song "My Boatless Booze Cruise" from the album Apathy and Exhaustion
 The mixtape cover art is inspired by Los Angeles painter and graphic designer  Luke Chueh's "The Explosion."
 The song title "Everything People Say That I Am, That's What I'm Not" is inspired by English indie rock band Arctic Monkeys' debut album Whatever People Say I Am, That's What I'm Not.

References

External links
https://web.archive.org/web/20100719120816/http://gwalkermixtape.com/

2010 mixtape albums
Gerald Walker albums